Bob Clark (May 1922-December 9, 2015) was born in Omaha, Nebraska. He received a B.S. and M.A. while studying journalism and politics. Bob was a television reporter and White House Correspondent for ABC News from the 1960s until the 1970s. He is most remembered for reporting the assassinations of John F. Kennedy in 1963 and Robert F. Kennedy in 1968. He was riding in a press car in President Kennedy’s Dallas motorcade in 1963 and witnessed RFK’s 1968 murder at the Ambassador Hotel in Los Angeles. Clark was the only person to see both Kennedy brothers after each was shot in Dallas, Texas and Los Angeles, California, respectively.

He was also a contributing host to the ABC Sunday interview program, then entitled Issues and Answers, now known as This Week. Later in his life, around the 1990s, Clark was a guest commentator on C-SPAN.

He died December 9, 2015, at the age of 93.

References

External links

Bob Clark Papers at GMU

American reporters and correspondents
American television journalists
American male journalists
2015 deaths
ABC News personalities
1922 births